The first World Record in the hammer throw for women (athletics) was recognised by the International Association of Athletics Federations in 1994.

Up to today, the IAAF has ratified 25 world records in the event.

Record Progression

References

Hammer 
World record
Hammer, women\